Phosphatidate cytidylyltransferase 1 is an enzyme that in humans is encoded by the CDS1 gene.

Function 
Breakdown products of phosphoinositides are ubiquitous second messengers that function downstream of many G protein-coupled receptors and tyrosine kinases regulating cell growth, calcium metabolism, and protein kinase C activity. This gene encodes an enzyme which regulates the amount of phosphatidylinositol available for signaling by catalyzing the conversion of phosphatidic acid to CDP-diacylglycerol. This enzyme is an integral membrane protein localized to two subcellular domains, the matrix side of the inner mitochondrial membrane where it is thought to be involved in the synthesis of phosphatidylglycerol and cardiolipin. and the cytoplasmic side of the endoplasmic reticulum where it functions in phosphatidylinositol biosynthesis. Two genes encoding this enzyme have been identified in humans, one mapping to human chromosome 4q21 (this gene) and a second (CDS2) to 20p13.

References

Further reading

External links 
 

EC 2.7.7